K.C. Munchkin!, released in Europe as Munchkin, is a maze game for the Magnavox Odyssey 2. Its North American title is an inside reference to then president of Philips Consumer Electronics, Kenneth C. Menkin.

Designed and programmed by Ed Averett, Munchkin is very heavily based on Namco's 1980 arcade game Pac-Man, but not a direct clone. It was, however, similar enough for Atari to sue Philips and force them to cease production of Munchkin. Atari was exclusively licensed to produce the first play-at-home version of Pac-Man, but Munchkin hit store shelves in 1981, a year before Atari's game was ready. Atari initially failed to convince a U.S. district court to halt the sale of Munchkin, but ultimately won its case on appeal. In 1982, the appellate court found that Philips had copied Pac-Man and made alterations that "only tend to emphasize the extent to which it deliberately copied the Plaintiff's work." The ruling was one of the first to establish how copyright law would apply to the look and feel of computer software.

Pac-Man dispute 

Atari sued Philips for copyright infringement, arguing that Munchkin copied Pac-Man with its substantial similarities as evidence. In Atari, Inc. v. North American Philips Consumer Electronics Corp., the court noted twenty-two similarities, but also nine differences: 

 There are only 12 pills (called munchies) in each maze, which begin in four groups of three but move through the maze independently and at speeds that increase as each one is eaten. The final munchie moves at the same speed as the Munchkin and must be intercepted rather than followed.
 The super-pills are called blinking munchies because they flash and change colour.
 Some of the mazes become invisible as soon as the player starts moving.
 It has a programmable mode, where the player can create mazes.
 It has a random mode, where a new map is generated each time the game is played.
 The box where eaten ghosts regenerate rotates, so the ghosts may exit from any side. Also, the player character is free to enter the box and, if powered up, can consume new monsters at the moment they regenerate. Although the box is always at the center of any maze, the maze design allows walls to be placed against the box so it doubles as a revolving door and danger zone to pass through.
 The ghosts are called munchers, and the player's character is called Munchkin.
 There are three munchers rather than four ghosts.
 Compared with the Atari 2600 version of Pac-Man, Munchkin has fewer objects on the game board but renders them with more color and animation.
 When the Munchkin is killed by the munchers, the score resets itself back to zero.

After Munchkin was forced off the market, Philips released a sequel called K.C.'s Krazy Chase! (Crazy Chase outside the U.S.) which implicitly depicts the conflict between Phillips and Atari by pitting the Munchkin character against an insectoid, tree-eating opponent called the Dratapillar, which very strongly resembles the antagonist of Atari's Centipede. In Crazy Chase'''s maze, the Munchkin character powers up and advances not by eating pills, but by devouring the Dratapillar's segmented body. Redesigned to avoid another copyright dispute, the Munchkin character rolls through Crazy Chase's mazes without the continuous chomping motion characteristic of Pac-Man.

 See also 
 List of Magnavox Odyssey² games
 Stern Electronics Inc. v. Kaufman, in which the 2nd Circuit reached the same decision
 List of Pac-Man clones

References

Sources
 Schwarz, Haller (1982) Pac-Mania''. Publications International, Ltd.

External links
Videopac Database Entry at Videopac.org
GameSpy review of Munchkin
Summary of Atari lawsuit
Interview with programmer Ed Averett
Review of K.C. Munchkin at Gamespy

1981 video games
Pac-Man clones
Magnavox Odyssey 2 games
Video games about food and drink
Video games developed in the United States
Video games involved in plagiarism controversies